Zev (1920–1943) was an American thoroughbred horse racing Champion and National Museum of Racing and Hall of Fame inductee.

Background
A brown colt, Zev was sired by The Finn and was out of the mare Miss Kearney (by Planudes).  Bred by the famous horseman John E. Madden, Zev was owned by the Rancocas Stable of Harry F. Sinclair, the founder of Sinclair Oil, who was a central figure in the Teapot Dome scandal and served time in prison.

Sinclair named the horse in honor of his friend and personal lawyer, Colonel James William (also known as J.W.) Zeverly.

Racing career

1922: Two-year-old season
Trained by Sam Hildreth, as a two-year-old Zev won five of his twelve races, finished second on four occasions, and was a Champion colt of 1922.

1923: Three-year-old season
The following year, he was the dominant three-year-old in America, winning a number of important Grade I stakes races under jockey Earl Sande.  Included in his victories were the Lawrence Realization Stakes and the most prestigious race in the United States, the Kentucky Derby, for which David J. Leary was credited as trainer, as he was for the Preakness Stakes, which was run before the Kentucky Derby in 1923.  Zev encountered problems in the Preakness and finished 12th but came back to win the Derby and then the Belmont Stakes.

On October 20, 1923, one of the most significant match races in worldwide thoroughbred racing took place at Belmont Park on Long Island, New York.  A crowd estimated at close to 50,000 watched Zev beat Epsom Derby winner Papyrus by five lengths.  Zev's victory marked the first time a Kentucky Derby winner defeated an English Derby winner. In November, Zev won another match race, this one controversially close, against In Memoriam at Churchill Downs. His performances in 1923 earned Zev the titles American Horse of the Year and Co-Champion Three-Year-Old Male.

1924: Four-year-old season
After successfully campaigning as a four-year-old, Zev retired as racing's all-time leading money earner, surpassing Man o' War's record.

Stud career
At stud, he proved less successful than he had on the track, at best siring two minor stakes winners (Zevson and Zida).

In 1983, Zev was inducted in the National Museum of Racing and Hall of Fame. In The Blood-Horse magazine ranking of the top 100 U.S. thoroughbred champions of the 20th Century, he was accorded 56th place.

See also
 List of historical horses

References

1920 racehorse births
1943 racehorse deaths
Racehorses trained in the United States
Racehorses bred in Kentucky
American Thoroughbred Horse of the Year
United States Thoroughbred Racing Hall of Fame inductees
Kentucky Derby winners
Belmont Stakes winners
American Champion racehorses
Thoroughbred family 23-b
Godolphin Arabian sire line